Anthony Robert Elliott (April 28, 1959 – December 31, 2007) was an American football defensive lineman who played seven seasons in the National Football League (NFL) for the New Orleans Saints. He attended North Texas and Wisconsin.

References
Obituary

1959 births
2007 deaths
Warren Harding High School alumni
Players of American football from New York City
American football defensive linemen
North Texas Mean Green football players
New Orleans Saints players
Wisconsin Badgers football players